The leaf green tree frog (Ranoidea phyllochroa) is a species of stream-dwelling frog, native to eastern Australia from the Queensland/New South Wales border south to Sydney.

Description

It can be light green to dark olive green to light brown to dark brown on the dorsal surface. A pale golden stripe runs from the nostril, across the eye, over the typanum, and down the side, underlined by a dark brown stripe, which also goes over the typanum, not across it. The forelimbs, groin, and thighs are dark red. The toes are three-quarters webbed and toe discs are large. The belly is white.

Ecology and behaviour
This species inhabits flowing streams in rainforest, woodland, and wet or dry sclerophyll forest along the coast and ranges of New South Wales. Males make an "Erk..Ek..Ek..Derk" call from stream-side vegetation during spring, summer and autumn, especially on warm nights; they are often seen in suburban creeks around Sydney and near the sea.

Key
This key distinguishes between the physical differences of the leaf green tree frog, southern leaf green tree frog and frogs that represent species described as Pearson's green tree frog and mountain stream tree frog. All of these species are very closely related and look similar. Their taxonomy species is under review.

Distribution:

R. barringtonensis - mid-north coast of NSW
R. nudidigitus - south of Sydney, NSW
R. phyllochroa - from Sydney to mid-north coast of NSW
R. pearsoniana - north-east NSW and south-east Qld

Dorsal surface

R. barringtonensis - black dots present, usually very distinct and many dots (see photo) 
R. nudidigitus - no black dots present
R. phyllochroa - no black dots present
R. pearsoniana - black dots usually present (not as distinct and not as many as L. barringtonensis), although some specimens have none, or very few

Tympanum:

R. barringtonensis - distinct, no colouration
R. nudidigitus - indistinct, no colouration
R. phyllochroa - distinct, no colouration
R. pearsoniana - distinct, brown in colour

Shoulder and groin colouration:

R. barringtonensis - None present.
R. nudidigitus - red to black colouration (shoulder), red (groin)
R. phyllochroa - red-brown colouration (shoulder), red (groin)
R. pearsoniana - none present

Head stripe:

R. barringtonensis - light brown or yellow, passes over the tympanum 
R. nudidigitus - gold with a black underline, passes over the tympanum
R. phyllochroa - gold with a dark brown underline, passes over the tympanum
R. pearsoniana - light brown with a thicker brown underline, passes through the tympanum

As a pet
It is kept as a pet; in Australia, this animal may be kept in captivity with the appropriate permit.

Sources
Anstis, M. 2002. Tadpoles of South-eastern Australia. Reed New Holland: Sydney.
Robinson, M. 2002. A Field Guide to Frogs of Australia. Australian Museum/Reed New Holland: Sydney.
Frogs Australia Network-frog call available here.
Frog and Tadpole Study Group

References
  Database entry includes a range map and a brief justification of why this species is of least concern
Article Road: List of All Frog Breeds: Things You Can Do to Ensure Your Frog Has a Long, Happy and Healthy Life: Leaf Green Tree Frog
Department of Environment, Climate Change and Water, New South Wales: Amphibian Keeper's Licence: Species Lists

Ranoidea (genus)
Amphibians of New South Wales
Amphibians described in 1863
Taxa named by Albert Günther
Frogs of Australia
Taxobox binomials not recognized by IUCN